Arturo Adolfo Palma Cisneros (born 16 January 2002) is a Mexican professional footballer who plays as an attacking midfielder for Liga MX club Necaxa.

Career statistics

Club

References

External links
 
 
 

Living people
2002 births
Mexican footballers
Association football midfielders
Club Necaxa footballers
Liga MX players
Querétaro F.C. footballers
Footballers from Mexico City